Borsa Italiana, based in Milan, is the Italian stock exchange. It manages and organises domestic market, regulating procedures for admission and listing of companies and intermediaries and supervising disclosures for listed companies.

Following exchange privatisation in 1997, the Italian Bourse was established and became effective on 2 January 1998. On 23 June 2007, the Italian Bourse became a subsidiary of the London Stock Exchange Group. This changed on 9 October 2020, when a €4.3 billion deal was agreed between the London Stock Exchange Group and pan-European stock exchange group Euronext. Euronext's acquisition of the Italian Bourse was completed on 29 April 2021. It is expected Italian Bourse will be rebranded as Euronext Milan in due course.

Borsa Italiana is also informally known as Piazza Affari ("Business Square"), after the city square of Milan where its headquarters (the Palazzo Mezzanotte building) is located.

Borsa Italiana is chaired by Andrea Sironi (former LSEG director), and Fabrizio Testa is the CEO.

Borsa Italiana is regulated by the Commissione Nazionale per le Società e la Borsa (CONSOB), an agency of the Ministry of Economy and Finance, based in Rome. As of April 2018, overall capitalisation for listed companies on Borsa Italiana was worth €644.3 billion, representing 37.8% of Italian GDP.

History

The Borsa di commercio di Milano (Milan Stock Exchange) was established by Eugène de Beauharnais, viceroy of the Napoleonic Kingdom of Italy, through decrees dated 16 January and 6 February 1808. It operated under public ownership until 1998, when it was privatized.
In 1997, all the Italian stocks were merged. Before that year, other smaller stocks exchanges were based in Naples, Turin, Trieste, Venice, Genoa, Florence, Bologna, Rome, and Palermo. In 1991, the electronic exchanges were approved, and in 1994, the market with grids (A,B,C) was abolished. In Milan were also the currencies exchange rates fixing and the commodities fixing.

On 1 October 2007, Borsa Italiana was merged with the London Stock Exchange in an all-share takeover, thus becoming part of the London Stock Exchange Group. In March 2016, the London Stock Exchange Group announced the agreement to merge in an all-stock deal with Deutsche Borse, but was subsequently blocked by the EU Competition Regulator.

On 18 September 2020, the London Stock Exchange Group entered into exclusive talks to sell the Italian Bourse to Euronext. On 29 April 2021, following the entry of CDP Equity and Intesa San Paolo (Italian institutional investors) as shareholders of Euronext, the European group assumed control of the company. Its weight on the total Italian economy is growing: the overall capitalization of listed companies in December 2021 stood at 757 billion (equal to 43.1% of GDP), up by 24.7% compared to 2020.

Samantha French is the Programme Manager for the separation of Borsa Italiana from the London Stock Exchange Group.

Operations
Borsa Italiana acts as a market management firm operating with autonomy and flexibility. It organises and manages the domestic stock market along with Italian and international brokers through a fully electronic trading system. Among its leading tasks, Borsa Italiana supervises listed companies, defining rules for admission and listings and supervising transaction activities.

Trading hours
The exchange has pre-market sessions from 8AM to 9AM, normal trading sessions from 9am to 5:30PM and post-market sessions from 6PM to 8:30PM on all days of the week except Saturdays, Sundays, and holidays declared by the Exchange in advance.

Markets
Major trading markets for Borsa Italiana are:
MTA, the leading equity market, which is devoted to mid and large-size companies. It includes two segments: STAR, for mid-sized firms, and MTA International, on which shares from non-Italian issuers already listed on other European markets are traded;
AIM Italia, which collects stocks by small and medium high-growth companies;
MIV  (Market For Investment Vehicles), on which retail and professional investors operates on investment vehicles which have a defined strategic vision;

Borsa Italiana also include markets for derivatives (IDEM), ETF (ETFPlus) and bonds (MOT).

Indices 

Borsa Italiana's main indices are:
FTSE Italia All Share
FTSE MIB, a capitalisation-weighted index of 40 of the biggest companies chosen to represent 10 economic sectors, created in 2009 
FTSE Italia Mid Cap
FTSE Italia Small Cap
FTSE AIM Italia
AIM Italia Investable

Listed companies
For a full list see :Category:Companies listed on the Borsa Italiana.

See also

 List of stock exchanges
 Economy of Italy

References
Notes

External links

 

2007 mergers and acquisitions
2021 mergers and acquisitions
Economy of Milan
Euronext national listing venues
Finance in Italy
Financial services companies established in 1808
Italian companies established in 1808
Stock exchanges in Italy